Veeradhi Veera is a 1985 Indian Kannada-language film, directed by  Vijay and produced by N. N. Bhat. The film stars Vishnuvardhan, Geetha, Vajramuni and Sudheer. The film has musical score by M. Ranga Rao. This was the last film of Musuri Krishnamurthy before his death.

Cast

Vishnuvardhan
Geetha
Vajramuni
Sudheer
Mukhyamantri Chandru
Musuri Krishnamurthy
N. S. Rao
Doddanna
Kanchana
Soumyashree
Rani
Shakila
Baby Rekha
Ravichandra
B. K. Shankar
Chikkanna
Karantha
Master Chethan

Soundtrack
The music was composed by M. Ranga Rao.

References

External links
 

1985 films
1980s Kannada-language films
Films scored by M. Ranga Rao
Films directed by Vijay (director)